The Udhana–Navsari Highway, colloquially the "U.N. Road", connects the city of Surat with Navsari, the capital of Parsi headquarters in the state of Gujarat, India. It is a major artery of commerce and public transport, and is witnessing a major construction boom along its route to Navsari.
Udhana-Navsari highway's video and detail on DeshGujarat.Com

See also
List of tourist attractions in Surat

Roads in Gujarat
Transport in Surat